X chromosome inactivation (XCI) is the phenomenon that has been selected during the evolution to balance X-linked gene dosage between XX females and XY males.

Phases 

XCI is usually divided in two phases, the establishment phase when gene silencing is reversible, and maintenance phase when gene silencing becomes irreversible. During the establishment phase of X Chromosome Inactivation (XCI), Xist RNA, the master regulator of this process, is monoallelically upregulated and it spreads in cis along the future inactive X (Xi),  relocates to the nuclear periphery. and recruits repressive chromatin-remodelling complexes Among these, Xist recruits proteins of the Polycomb repressive complexes. Whether Xist directly recruits Polycomb repressive complex 2 (PRC2) to the chromatin or this recruitment is the consequence of Xist-mediated changes on the chromatin  has been object of intense debate.

Mechanism 

Some studies showed that PRC2 components are not associated with Xist RNA or do not interact functionally.  However another study  has shown by means of mass spectrometry analysis, that two subunits of PRC2 may interact with Xist, although these proteins are also found in other complexes and are not unique components of the PRC2 complex.

PRC2 binds the A-repeat (RepA) of Xist RNA directly and with very high affinity (dissociation constants of 10-100 nanomolar), supporting Xist-mediated recruitment of PRC2 to the X chromosome. However it is not clear whether such interactions occurs in vivo under physiological conditions. Failure to turn up PRC2 proteins in function screens may be due to cells not being able to survive or compete without PRC2 or incomplete screens. Two super resolution microscopy analyses have presented different views from each other. One showed that Xist and PRC2 are spatially separated, while another showed that Xist and PRC2 are tightly linked. It is possible that several mechanisms recruit PRC2 in parallel, including direct Xist-mediated recruitment, adaptor proteins, chromatin changes, RNA pol II exclusion, or PRC1 recruitment. For instance, PRC2 recruitment is linked to PRC1-mediated H2A119 ubiquitination in differentiating embryonic stem cells (ESCs). where PRC1 recruitment is mediated by hnrnpK and Xist repB.  In fully differentiated cells, PRC2 recruitment seems to be dependent on Xist RepA. It is possible that alternative and complementary pathways such as phase separation  work to establish PRC2 recruitment on the X in different experimental systems and during different stages of development.

References 

Cell biology